"Call Me When You're Sober" is a song by American rock band Evanescence from their second studio album, The Open Door. It was released as the album's lead single on September 4, 2006. The track was written by Amy Lee and guitarist Terry Balsamo, and produced by Dave Fortman. A musical fusion of alternative metal, symphonic rock, and electropop, the song was inspired by the end of Lee's relationship with singer Shaun Morgan as well as Lee's other experiences at the time. 

"Call Me When You're Sober" peaked at number ten on the US Billboard Hot 100 and number four on the Alternative Songs chart, and entered the top ten of several Billboard component charts. It also peaked within the top ten on multiple international charts, including the UK, Australia, Italy, Canada, and New Zealand. It was certified platinum by the Recording Industry Association of America and gold by the Australian Recording Industry Association. The song received generally positive reception from music critics. Its music video was directed by Marc Webb, and depicts a metaphorical visual, drawing inspiration from the fairy tale "Little Red Riding Hood".

Background and release
The Open Door was set for release in October 2006 with "Call Me When You're Sober" announced as its first single. When the song was first released, it was speculated by the media that the song referenced Amy Lee's ex-boyfriend, Seether's singer Shaun Morgan.

Initially reluctant to reveal the song's inspiration, Lee later confirmed it in an August 2006 interview. Her confirmation came shortly after Morgan was admitted to a rehabilitation center to undergo treatment for "combination of substances". Lee stated that when conceiving the song, she was aware that "people would read between the lines", hence, she tried to "be completely clear". With it, she felt the need to "say exactly what I was feeling for so long", and described her process of creating music as a form of a therapy that gave her a medium to express the negative things that had happened in her life and allow her to "turn something bad into something beautiful". Writing the song helped her in the process of healing from a "painful ending to a relationship". She stated:
"I think it's impossible to hide how obvious it is. The day that our single hit the airwaves, my ex-boyfriend said he was going into rehab and canceled their tour. I haven't ever said right out who it was about, but it's about the big relationship I was in, and the whole breakup, which was really long. The breaking up and the hard stuff in our relationship happened sort of after I was out of the spotlight for a while and writing. It wasn't in any way public. I was trying to be kind of discreet about it, and then he totally came out and said he was going to rehab. It was shocking to me. It kind of made for a more interesting story."

She added that she felt "brave" writing the straight-forward lyrics as she was "sick of hiding behind metaphors" in everything she had written before, and "so much of the record was about the turmoil I was going through". She was letting herself "be run down", and in the end, "had to choose happiness and health" for herself. Lee said she supports Morgan in his rehabilitation and is "really happy for him." She also noted that the song was also inspired by other events in her life, including people who she was working with that were "holding me down and manipulating me and betraying me", eventually leading her to make the decision to "put my foot down and walk out the door". 

In 2007, after finishing his rehabilitation, Morgan said the song had "haunted" him around and negatively affected his reputation. He stated that it was not pleasant to hear a song describing him as a "bad guy" that "millions of people have heard". He elaborated, "I was really upset that she would say and do those things. In any relationship, I don't think it's right to say and do those things when people break up, and she obviously felt the need to go out there and make me sound like a complete a--hole". At the time, Seether's album Finding Beauty in Negative Spaces was to be released soon and it was speculated that it would contain an answer song to "Call Me When You're Sober", with "Breakdown" was initially pinpointed as one. Morgan clarified that that song was not an "angry backlash" and it was "more universal" as he was trying to be "more vague and respectful". He added that Finding Beauty in Negative Spaces did not contain other answer songs aimed at Lee either, as "I know what the expectations are for this album and that people will be looking for that Amy Lee reference, and I am trying desperately not to have any", further noting how any references would be instead about another relationship of his that had recently ended. 

In an October 2006 interview, Lee expressed "no intention of hurting [Morgan]" when writing the song, and said that once the song came out without any metaphors, she wanted to keep it. In 2011, Lee described "Call Me When You're Sober" as "mostly a chick anthem", and deemed it empowering for female listeners of their fandom based on the response she had received from them. In retrospect, Lee mentioned in 2016, "I love this song because it has this fun spirit that was new for us as a band. You can still be heavy with a smile on your face."

"Call Me When You're Sober" had a limited radio release as the first single off The Open Door on July 31, 2006. This was followed by a wider release the following week. Wind-up Records serviced the song to radio in August 2006. Subsequently, the recording was made available for digital download on September 4, 2006, and a physical release as a single followed on September 25.

Recording and composition
"Call Me When You're Sober" was written by Amy Lee and Terry Balsamo, with production by Dave Fortman. The programming of the track was finished by DJ Lethal, with Lee and guitarist John LeCompt doing additional programming. Lee's sisters, Carrie and Lori Lee, perform backing vocals on the song.

Lee and Balsamo started working on the song during their writing session in Florida; Lee played the music she had imagined for the song in her room and Balsamo was working on a very different "heavy riff". Upon hearing his guitar, Lee proposed that they mix both pieces together which led to the conception of "Call Me When You're Sober". According to the sheet music published by Alfred Publishing on the website Musicnotes.com, "Call Me When You're Sober" was written in the key of E minor. It is set in common time and performed in a moderately fast tempo of 96 beats per minute for a total length of 3 minutes and 34 seconds. Lee's vocal range in the song spans from the low note of G3 to the high note of Eb5. Music journalists identified various genres in "Call Me When You're Sober", including symphonic rock, soul, electropop, piano balladry, nu metal, hard rock, and R&B. The New York Times said the song starts off as a "piano ballad, swerves into hard rock, then builds to a grandiose pop-orchestral refrain, and later on a glorious, glimmering bridge." Blabbermouth.net described the song as a "fusion of crunching guitars and wistful piano breaks".

Lyrically, "Call Me When You're Sober" depicts the difficult situation of a female protagonist dealing with the behavior of a lover with substance addiction; she eventually decides to move away from this dysfunctional relationship. Andree Farias from Christianity Today said the song was "self-explanatory". St. Louis Post-Dispatch called it a "scathing missive" in which Lee doesn't "hide her still-raw emotions". Kerrang! described it as "an unusually transparent, autobiographical dissection of [Lee's] abortive relationship" and a "tough-love song insistent that she won't be brought down by anyone else's addictions". The line "make up your mind" repeated during the song's chorus is replaced with "I've made up your mind" at the end, indicating that the protagonist has moved on, eventually realizing her worth.

Critical reception
The song received generally positive reviews from contemporary music critics; many perceived it as a highlight on the album and praised Lee's vocals and self-assuredness, while some saw it as an unworthy comeback with unmemorable guitar backing. Ed Thompson of IGN picked the song as one of the album's highlights. A writer from The Boston Globe deemed the song the album's "hard-charging opening salvo".  AllMusics Stephen Thomas Erlewine regarded it as one of the album's three highlights, saying that it has structure, hooks and momentum. In his review of The Open Door for the Hartford Courant, Eric R. Danton observed that Lee was more certain and in charge of the whole album, which he found to be exemplified on the "terse rocker" with an "acerbic message" that is "Call Me When You're Sober". The New York Times Kelefa Sanneh praised Lee's vocal performance calling it "terrific", adding that the song "crashes through different styles while remaining diabolically hummable". Nicholas Fonseca of Entertainment Weekly called "Call Me When You're Sober" an "angry-goth anthem". Rob Sheffield of Rolling Stone said Lee's "big bodice-ripping voice" is over the top on the song, which suits it. 

The Courier-Mails Jason Nahrung felt that the song was the album's most radio-friendly track and reminiscent of Lee's previous work with Moody, which according to him meant a use of "heavy bass and drums, spotless and lavish production and Lee's unmistakable vocals". A writer for Canada.com concluded that Evanescence showed their "staying power" on the "biting single". A Billboard writer deemed the song an "anthemic grinder" in which "Lee's vocal is other-worldly and the song's overall impact is strong, however, there's really nothing new going on". Metal Edge wrote of the track, "fans might be surprised by the R&B-flavoured vocal melody and piano chords that introduce [the song]. But it’s not really a stretch once those crunchy guitars kick in, and the soulful chorus breaks new ground for the band without straying from its signature style." In his review, Don Kaye of Blabbermouth.net called it a "blunt emotional assessment" and a "huge, dramatic, sweeping number, complete with massive hooks and a powerful, fearless performance from Lee". Bryan Reesman of Metal Hammer said the song highlights Lee's songwriting talents. Kerrang!s Sam Law deemed the song a "watershed of confidence and catharsis, with the genre-mashing ... emphasising a talent finally unbound", and complimented the "rich backing vocals to an already-luxuriant mix." 

"Call Me When You're Sober" was ranked at number 86 on the annual poll Pazz & Jop collected by The Village Voice in 2006. Conversely, it was included in a list of The Most Annoying Songs of 2006 compiled by ABC News. The track was nominated in the category for Favorite Rock Song at the 33rd People's Choice Awards. In 2011, Loudwire journalist Mary Ouellette, placed the song at number two on her list of 10 Best Evanescence Songs. She called it a "perfectly crafted ode to an ex-boyfriend" with relatable lyrics and an "undeniably addictive melody". In 2016, Brittany Porter from AXS listed it at number four on her list of the band's 10 best songs.

Chart performance
For the week ending September 2, 2006, "Call Me When You're Sober" debuted at numbers 25 and 11 on the US Billboard Hot 100 and on the Hot Digital Songs chart, respectively. The following week, it moved to its peak position of number ten on the former chart, being the greatest sell gainer for that chart issue. With this feat, the song became the band's third and last top ten single on that chart. It remained on the Billboard Hot 100 for a total of twenty two weeks, last seen at number 35. Furthermore, the single peaked in the top ten of several other Billboard charts in the US; on the Adult Pop Songs chart it attained the position of six for the week ending of November 11, 2006, and on the Mainstream Top 40 it peaked at number seven for the week ending November 25, 2006. It additionally peaked at numbers four and five on the Billboard Hot Modern Rock Tracks and the Billboard Hot Mainstream Rock Tracks charts, respectively. The single ranked at number 77 on the Hot 100 year-end chart for 2006. It was certified platinum by the Recording Industry Association of America (RIAA) on February 17, 2009, for selling more than one million copies in the US.

Internationally, "Call Me When You're Sober" charted within the top ten in many countries. The song debuted at number 32 on the UK Singles Chart on the chart issue dated September 30, 2006. The following week, it moved to number four and this later became its peak position in that country; with this feat, the song became the band's fourth top ten and their second top five single in the UK. It spent a total of eight weeks on the UK Singles Chart and was last ranked at number 69 on the chart issue dated November 11, 2006. On the year-end chart in the country, the song was placed at number 139. On September 21, 2006, it debuted in Italy at its peak position of number three, where it spent an additional week. It charted for six weeks in the country's top ten. Other European countries where the single entered the top ten of the charts include Switzerland, where it peaked at number six, Austria and Finland where it peaked at number seven and the Netherlands where it peaked at number nine.

In Australia, the song debuted at number five on the ARIA Singles Chart on October 1, 2006, and spent the following week at that same position. It fell to number seven on October 15, 2006, and it spent additional three weeks there. The song was last seen at number 44 on February 4, 2007, having spent a total of 18 weeks in the top forty of the chart. At the end of 2006, the single emerged as the thirty second best-selling single on the country's year-end chart. It ranked at number five on the list of most played songs in Australia in 2007. The Australian Recording Industry Association (ARIA) awarded the single with a gold certification in 2006 for shipment of 35,000 copies in that country. In New Zealand, "Call Me When You're Sober" debuted at number nine on the New Zealand Singles Chart on September 18, 2006. It climbed to number four the following week and peaked at number three on the chart issue dated October 2, 2006. It spent a total of 18 weeks in the chart's top thirty, before exiting on January 15, 2007.

Music video

A music video for the song was directed by Marc Webb and filmed in Hollywood, Los Angeles in July 2006 with a 400.000$ budget. Filming was initially scheduled to start in late June, but the sessions were pushed to the second week of July. The video's storyline is based on the fairy tale "Little Red Riding Hood", with Lee calling it a "modern re-imagining" of that story with a "more cool, superhero, rock and roll" protagonist. During an interview with MTV News, Lee talked about the concept behind the clip, noting that with the song's literal lyrics and title, "we felt like the video would have the freedom to go in a less literal direction". Several real wolves were used when filming the video, accompanied by four personal trainers. While on set, Lee started having allergic reactions to the animals but managed to continue and went on singing and petting them. Webb approached her with the idea of doing something alike to a choreography where she would walk down the stairs, surrounded by several female dancers to which Lee agreed. According to footage from the behind-the-scenes clip from the music video, the director also proposed to Lee to straddle her lover in the video, but she, opposed to selling sex, refused, jokingly saying: "You can't blame a guy for trying."

In the video, Lee plays Little Red Riding Hood while actor Oliver Goodwill plays the Big Bad Wolf, who tries to seduce her. The clip begins with Lee at a vanity wearing a red satin cape, lip-syncing to the lyrics while sitting at opposite ends of a dining table with her lover played by Goodwill. She is then shown standing in front of a mirror while her lover comes behind her; he starts caressing her shoulders and prepares to kiss her, but Lee refuses and pulls away from him. Shots of the band playing the song together and Lee sitting among wolves are interspersed among other scenes of the video. During the song's bridge, Lee appears descending a staircase, backed by four back-up dancers dressed in black clothing; upon reaching the bottom, both Lee and the dancers start levitating in the air. At the end of the song, Lee is seen walking atop the length of the dining table, while chairs and tabletop items are flung aside as she passes. She reaches her lover at the other end of the table, places her finger on his lips, and sings "I've made up your mind", indicating that he should start packing his things and leave. The video ends with Lee giggling behind the piano.

The clip premiered on MTV, MTV2, VH1 and Fuse TV in the United States on August 7, 2006; it was also broadcast on MuchOnDemand in Canada. It managed to peak at number one on MTV's Total Request Live (TRL). Corey Moss of MTV News concluded that the visual was "an abstract take on somewhat literal lyrics". Kelefa Saneh from The New York Times interpreted the clip as a metaphor, observing how despite being placed among wolves, Lee does not appear to be intimidated by them. News Limited writer Kathy McCabe felt that Little Red Riding Hood was the "perfect role for the gothrock goddess". The clip for the song was ranked at number ten on VH1's list of Top 40 Videos of 2006. It was nominated in the category for Best International Video by a group at the 2007 MuchMusic Video Awards but lost to "Welcome to the Black Parade" (2006) by My Chemical Romance. The clip also received a nomination in the category for Best Video at the 2007 NRJ Music Awards but lost to "De retour" (2007) by M. Pokora.

Live performances
Evanescence performed "Call Me When You're Sober" during the 2011 Rock in Rio festival on October 2, 2011. On April 11, 2012, the band performed the song at the 2012 Revolver Golden Gods Awards in Los Angeles.

Usage in media
In June 2009, "Bring Me to Life", "Call Me When You're Sober" and "Weight of the World" were included in the video game Rock Band as downloadable songs. The following year, the song was also included on the iOS game Rock Band Reloaded. "Call Me When You're Sober" was also used in the Nintendo DS soundtrack for the game Band Hero (2009).

Credits and personnel
Credits are adapted from The Open Door liner notes.

Vocals, piano – Amy Lee
Guitar – Terry Balsamo
Guitar – John LeCompt
Bass – Tim McCord
Drums – Rocky Gray

Production, mixing – Dave Fortman
Programming – DJ Lethal
Additional programming – Amy Lee, John LeCompt
Engineering – Jeremy Parker
Mastering – Ted Jensen
Background vocals – Carrie Lee and Lori Lee

Track listing and formats

UK Enhanced 2-CD Single
CD one:
"Call Me When You're Sober" (Album version) -  3:34
"Call Me When You're Sober" (Acoustic version) -  3:37

CD two:
"Call Me When You're Sober" (Album version) - 3:34
"Call Me When You're Sober" (Acoustic version) - 3:37
"Making of the Video" (Video clip) - 5:20
"Call Me When You're Sober" (Music video) - 3:33

UK 7" Vinyl single
"Call Me When You're Sober" (Album version) - 3:34
"Call Me When You're Sober" (Acoustic version) - 3:37

Charts

Weekly charts

Year-end charts

Certifications

See also
List of Billboard Hot 100 top 10 singles in 2006
List of UK top 10 singles in 2006

References

2000s ballads
2006 singles
2006 songs
Electropop ballads
Evanescence songs
Hard rock ballads
Music videos directed by Marc Webb
Songs written by Amy Lee
Songs written by Terry Balsamo
Wind-up Records singles
Symphonic rock songs
Electronic rock songs
Works based on Little Red Riding Hood